Buddhist socialism is a political ideology which advocates socialism based on the principles of Buddhism. Both Buddhism and socialism seek to provide an end to suffering by analyzing its conditions and removing its main causes through praxis. Both also seek to provide a transformation of personal consciousness (respectively, spiritual and political) to bring an end to human alienation and selfishness.
People who have been described as Buddhist socialists include Buddhadasa Bhikkhu, B. R. Ambedkar, S. W. R. D. Bandaranaike, Han Yong-un, Girō Senoo, U Nu, Uchiyama Gudō, Norodom Sihanouk, Takagi Kenmyo and Peljidiin Genden.

Buddhadāsa Bhikkhu coined the phrase Dhammic socialism. He believed that Socialism is a natural state meaning all things exist together in one system:

Han Yong-un felt that equality was one of the main principles of Buddhism. In an interview published in 1931, Yong-un spoke of his desire to explore Buddhist Socialism:

Tenzin Gyatso, the Fourteenth Dalai Lama of Tibet has said that:

See also 
Buddhist economics
Engaged Buddhism
Religious socialism

References

External links 
Dhammic Socialism, a Buddhist response to social suffering.

 
Religious socialism
Types of socialism